Xihu District, literally meaning "west lake district", is one of 6 urban districts of the prefecture-level city of Nanchang, the capital of Jiangxi Province, China. The district was created in the Tang Dynasty when a bridge was built across Nanchang's Taihu lake, dividing the area into the East and West Lake districts. It covers over 39 square kilometers and as of 2004 had a population of 460,000.

Administrative divisions
Xihu District is divided into 10 subdistricts and 1 town.:

10 subdistricts

1 town
 Taohua

References

External links
Nanchang Xihu Government Web(English)

Nanchang
County-level divisions of Jiangxi